Franz Deuticke is a Viennese scientific publishing company started by Stanislaw Töplitz and Franz Deuticke in 1878 as Töplitz & Deuticke, changing its name in 1886 when Deuticke had become sole proprietor. It published many of Sigmund Freud's works.

References

External links 
 http://www.answers.com/topic/deuticke-franz

Publishing companies of Austria
Mass media in Vienna